The phrase Fifth International refers to the efforts made by groups of socialists and communists to create a new workers' international.

Previous internationals

There have been several previous international workers' organisations, and the call for a Fifth International presupposes the recognition of four in particular, each of which regarded itself as the successor to the previous ones:
The "First International", known as the "International Workingmen's Association", founded in London in 1864.
The "Second International", founded in 1889 after the expulsion of anarchists from the First International, worked until its subsequent dissolution in 1916. The Second International was a direct ancestor of the Socialist International, an international organization of mainstream social democratic political parties.
The "Third International", known as the Communist International or "Comintern", founded by Vladimir Lenin in 1919 after the failure of the Second International at the start of World War I. The group was dissolved in 1943.
The "Fourth International", founded in 1938 by Leon Trotsky in opposition to Stalinism. Trotsky considered Comintern to be irreformable and to have crossed over to counter-revolution under the control of a bureaucratic elite in the Soviet Union. 

Although it still exists, the fragmentation of Trotskyism has resulted in the call for a fifth international.

Calls for a Fifth International
In November 1938, two months after the founding congress of the Fourth International, seven members of the Spanish Workers' Party of Marxist Unification on trial in Barcelona declared their support for a "fighting Fifth International". The Argentine Trotskyist  called for a Fifth International when he broke from Trotskyism in 1941. Another call for a Fifth International was made by Lyndon LaRouche after leaving the Spartacist League in 1965. Later, a "Fifth International of Communists" was founded in 1994 by several small former Trotskyist groups around the Movement for a Socialist Future.

League for the Fifth International

In 2003, the League for a Revolutionary Communist International called for the formation of the Fifth International "as soon as possible – not in the distant future but in the months and years ahead". The group became the League for the Fifth International (L5I), which as of 2010 has sections in Austria, the Czech Republic, Germany, Pakistan, Sri Lanka (the Socialist Party of Sri Lanka), Sweden, the United Kingdom and the United States. The League for the Fifth International campaigns in the European Social Forum and the international labour movement for the formation of a new International. Splinter group the Communist Workers' Group in New Zealand also argues for a Fifth International.

Hugo Chávez
Hugo Chávez announced in 2007 that he would seek to create a new international: "2008 could be a good time to convoke a meeting of left parties in Latin America to organise a new international, an organisation of parties and movements of the left in Latin America and the Caribbean".

It was reported that Bolivia's Movement for Socialism, the International Marxist Tendency, El Salvador's Farabundo Martí National Liberation Front, Nicaragua's Sandinista National Liberation Front, Ecuador's PAIS Alliance, Chile's Proposal for an Alternative Society, Guatemala's New Nation Alternative, and Australia's Socialist Alliance were likely to join the new International. Representatives of the Portugal's Left Bloc, Germany's The Left, and France's Left Party expressed interest but said they would need to consult. The Communist Party of Cuba seemed to favour the proposal, but other Communist Parties were strongly opposed. The League for the Fifth International critically supported the proposal.

In popular culture
Poet Allen Ginsberg mentions a Fifth International in "Footnote to Howl", the final part of his poem "Howl".

The card game Illuminati by Steve Jackson Games features the Fifth International as a "communist" and "conservative" group.

In the novel The Moon Is a Harsh Mistress by Robert Heinlein while discussing the different political ideologies of Professor de la Paz, Wyoming Knott, and Manuel O'Kelly-Davis as they attempted to design a revolution that would work to free Luna from Luna Authority control. The character Wyoming Knott identified herself as a Fifth Internationalist but stated she was "no Marxist".

See also
International Communist Seminar
International Meeting of Communist and Workers' Parties
São Paulo Forum

References

Left-wing internationals
Proposed international organizations
Socialist organizations
Trotskyism
International Socialist Organisations